Born This Way: The Collection is the second compilation album by American singer Lady Gaga, released on November 18, 2011, by Interscope Records. The three-disc set includes her second studio album Born This Way, the remix album Born This Way: The Remix, and the DVD Lady Gaga Presents the Monster Ball Tour: At Madison Square Garden. Photographer Nick Knight shot the cover of the release, which showed Gaga wearing a dress made of slime by designer Bart Hess. The box set was enclosed as a digipak with new booklets. The release received positive feedback from reviewers, but had minor commercial success, only entering charts in Greece, Italy, and South Korea.

Background
In October 2011, Lady Gaga announced plans to release a box set titled Born This Way: The Collection and a remix album titled Born This Way: The Remix. The box set was first released in Germany on November 18, 2011, and consisted of a 17-track version of Gaga's second studio album, Born This Way, the aforementioned remix album and a DVD release of the HBO concert special Lady Gaga Presents the Monster Ball Tour: At Madison Square Garden. Along with the collection, she also planned to release a coffee table book called Lady Gaga x Terry Richardson, containing pictures shot during The Monster Ball Tour. The album cover was released on October 21, 2011. The image shows Gaga wearing a dress made of slime by designer Bart Hess, a Perspex hat made by Charlie le Mindu, and heels by Alexander McQueen. Photographer Nick Knight shot the cover, and was initially one of the outtakes from the imagery shot for Born This Way, later re-touched and re-used as the box set's cover. New booklets were also provided alongside the regular ones and the whole case was in a digipak.

Reception
Stephen Thomas Erlewine of AllMusic gave a positive review, saying that the album is "for any fan of the singer who somehow has failed to pick up any or all of these along the way, this is a convenient way to grab all this Gaga at once". Idolator created a contest for a fan to win the box set, by tweeting about the release and e-mailing the website. Born This Way: The Collection debuted on the Greek Albums Chart at number 67 on the chart of December 16, 2011. The following week the album climbed eighteen positions, reaching number 49, which became its peak there. The album debuted on South Korean International Albums Chart at number 18 on the chart of December 3, 2011, remaining on the chart of South Korea for just one week.

Track listing

Chart

Release history

References

2011 compilation albums
Interscope Records compilation albums
Lady Gaga compilation albums
KonLive Distribution albums